"Power of Positive Drinkin'" is a song recorded by American country music singer Chris Janson. It was released in October 2015 the second single from his album Buy Me a Boat, which was released in late October 2015. Janson co-wrote the song with Chris DuBois and Mark Irwin.

Content
The song is a mid-tempo about a man who heads to a bar after a multiple misfortunes in life such as a breakup, a broken truck, and a bad day at work.

Critical reception
Website Taste of Country gave the song a positive review, writing that "Chris Janson‘s “Power of Positive Drinkin'” recalls his Warner Nashville debut “Buy Me a Boat” without sounding too familiar. He’s quickly building a brand of blue collar party songs that speak to guys (and women) like him."

Music video
The music video was directed by Michael Monaco and premiered in January 2016.

Chart performance

References

2015 singles
Warner Records Nashville singles
Chris Janson songs
2015 songs
Songs written by Chris Janson
Songs written by Chris DuBois
Songs written by Mark Irwin (songwriter)